"Backyard" is a song by American recording artist Pebbles, featuring a guest rap by Salt-N-Pepa. Taken from Pebbles' second album Always (1990), the song was released as the third single from the album on March 12, 1991.

Music video
Pebbles highlights rigors of other women coming between her partner and the need to look out for your significant other, against those interfering parties. The video starts with T-Boz of pre-TLC fame pointing out to Pebbles, that another woman is courting her boyfriend. Being later signed to Reid's Pebbitone management on February 28, 1991 as the music group TLC, this was both Tionne Watkins' and Lisa Lopes' first music video appearances.

Bernadette Cooper of the group Klymaxx also appears in the video playing the drums.

References

1991 singles
Babyface (musician) songs
Perri "Pebbles" Reid songs
Song recordings produced by Babyface (musician)
1990 songs
Songs written by Babyface (musician)
Song recordings produced by Dallas Austin
Song recordings produced by L.A. Reid
MCA Records singles
Songs written by L.A. Reid